Worb railway station could refer to two stations in Worb, Switzerland:

 Worb Dorf railway station
 Worb SBB railway station